Abdoulaye Traoré (born 4 March 1967), nicknamed Ben Badi, is an Ivorian former professional footballer who played as a forward. He scored 49 goals in 88 appearances for the Ivory Coast.

He made six Primeira Liga appearances for S.C. Braga.

In 2015, he became an ambassador of The SATUC Cup, a new charitable global football competition for U16 orphans, refugees and disadvantaged children.

Honours

Club
 Ligue 1 (Ivory Coast): 1990, 1991, 1992, 1993, 1994, 1995
 Coupe de Côte d'Ivoire: 1990, 1991
 CAF Champions League runner-up: 1995

International
 Africa Cup of Nations: 1992; third place: 1986, runner-up 1994
 FIFA Confederations Cup fourth place: 1992

Individual
 Ligue 1 (Ivory Coast) top scorer: 1992, 1994

References

External links

1967 births
Living people
Footballers from Abidjan
Association football forwards
Ivorian footballers
Ivory Coast international footballers
1992 King Fahd Cup players
Ligue 1 players
FC Metz players
FC Sète 34 players
SC Toulon players
AC Avignonnais players
ASEC Mimosas players
S.C. Braga players
1986 African Cup of Nations players
1988 African Cup of Nations players
1990 African Cup of Nations players
1992 African Cup of Nations players
1994 African Cup of Nations players
1996 African Cup of Nations players
Ivorian expatriate sportspeople in Portugal
Ivorian expatriate sportspeople in France
Ivorian expatriate footballers
Expatriate footballers in France
Expatriate footballers in Portugal
Stella Club d'Adjamé players
Expatriate footballers in Saudi Arabia
Al-Orobah FC players
Africa Cup of Nations-winning players
Saudi First Division League players
Ligue 1 (Ivory Coast) players